Khuzistan or Huzistan (Middle Persian: 𐭧𐭥𐭰𐭮𐭲𐭭 Hūzistān) was a Sasanian province in Late Antiquity, which almost corresponded to the present-day province of Khuzestan. Its capital was Gundeshapur. During the late Sasanian era, the province was included in the southern quadrant (kust) of Nemroz.

Name 
The name of Khuzistan (meaning  "the land of the Khuz") goes back to the Elamite period, where it was used to refer to the inhabitants that lived in the region from the 3rd millennium BC until the rise of the Achaemenid Empire in 539 BC.

Districts 
The administrative division of Khuzestan is uncertain, due to Arabic sources reporting varying reports. Khuzestan was divided at least into seven districts (rostag or tasug), the largest being Hormizd-Ardashir, whilst the others were; Rostam Kawad, Shushtar, Susa, Gundishapur, Ram-Hormizd and Dauraq.

History 
Under the Parthians, Khuzistan was known as Elymais, a Parthian sub-kingdom, which in  221 was defeated and conquered by the Persian prince Ardashir I, who would later overthrow the Parthians and establish the Sasanian Empire. Khuzistan is attested as a province in the Ka'ba-ye Zartosht inscription of the second Sasanian King of Kings (shahanshah) Shapur I. There it is mentioned right after Pars and Parthia, the country of the Sasanians and Parthians respectively, which demonstrates its importance. The prominent Zoroastrian priest Kartir likewise mentions the province in his inscription at Naqsh-e Rajab. In , Shapur I founded the city of Gundeshapur (Middle Persian: Weh-Andiōk-Šābuhr), which was established in a village called Pilabad, situated between Susa and Shushtar. The city, constructed as a place to settle Roman prisoners of war, subsequently became a Sasanian royal summer residence and the capital of Khuzistan. Shapur I's son and successor, Hormizd I founded two cities in Khuzistan; Hormizd-Ardashir and Ram-Hormizd. During the reign of Bahram II, a high-priest (mowbed) revolted in Khuzistan and briefly occupied the province.

Under Kavad I and his son and successor Khosrow I the empire was divided into four frontier regions (kust in Middle Persian), with a military commander (spahbed) in charge of each district. The frontier regions were known as xwarāsān (East), xwarārān (West), nēmrōz (South) and abāxtar (North). Khuzistan was along with Pars included in the southern quarter. Kirman and Sakastan were also sometimes included. Khuzistan was one of the first provinces to fall during the Muslim conquest of Iran; by 642 it was longer under Sasanian control.

Population 
The population was mainly centered around its river and canal systems. The north and east was populated by an amalgamation of Iranians and Elamites, while the western portion was populated by Aramaic-speaking people. Roman and Indian deportees also lived in the province.

Mint 
Khuzistan served as one of the mint-striking sites of the Sasanians, known by its mint abbreviation of "HŪZ". The city of Ram-Hormizd produced mints since at least the third century. A mint was established in Hormizd-Ardashir during the reign Ardashir II, and a mint was established in Gundeshapur and Susa during the reign of Bahram IV.

References

Sources

Further reading
 

Provinces of the Sasanian Empire
History of Khuzestan Province
224 establishments
640s disestablishments